Hypenodes orientalis is a species of moth in the family Erebidae. It was described by Staudinger in 1901. It is found in Turkey, the Near East, Armenia and the southern Caucasus.

References

Moths described in 1901
Hypenodinae
Insects of Turkey